This is a list of current WBC Youth world champions. The Youth title is one of the World Boxing Council's minor world championships for young up-and-coming professional boxers.

See also
List of WBC world champions
List of current WBC International champions

References

External links
WBC official site

Lists of boxing champions
World Boxing Council champions